Stewart Hadarezer Evans (June 19, 1908 — June 2, 1996) was a Canadian professional ice hockey player who played 367 games in the National Hockey League between 1930 and 1939.

Career

Professional hockey 
He left amateur hockey in Canada when he was hired as a defensemen for the Detroit Falcons in 1929. The Falcons were renamed in 1932 as the Detroit Red Wings. He played for the Red Wings until the 1933–34 season when he was traded to the Montreal Maroons. He won the Stanley Cup in 1935 with the Maroons. He served as the final captain of the Maroons from 1937 to 1938. He would play out the season with the Maroons then moving on the following season, 1938–39, to the Montreal Canadiens.

Post-playing career 
After retiring from hockey in 1939, Evans moved into the car business, and joined the Ford Motor Company as a labor relations manager. Although he went on to pursue business interest he never severed ties with the Red Wings.

In 1945 Evans built his first Lincoln-Mercury dealership. He acquired a second dealership in 1955 in Detroit, and by 1957 was the successful owner of a third dealership. At the height of his career in the car industry his company was among the nations top 100 in sales and customer satisfaction. In 1993 Stew sold his remaining dealerships ro his eldest grandson John but continued on as chairman of the board until his death in 1996.

In 1960 Evans founded the Red Wings Alumni Association and served as its first president.

Personal life
Evans was born June 19, 1907 in Ottawa, Ontario to Hadarezer and Jeanne "Jennie" (nee Lapalm) Evans. On August 12, 1930 in Iroquois Falls, Ontario, Canada Evans married Elizabeth Jane Thompson (1905–1983). They had three children. 

Evans's great-grandfather, Thomas Galway McNaughton Evans (1807–1898) was born in Limerick, Ireland. Thomas Galway Evans was the patriarch of the family that left Ireland and made it to North America where he died October 27, 1898 in Nepean, Carleton, Ontario, Canada.

Evans died on June 2, 1996 in Atlantis, Palm Beach County, Florida. He was survived by his wife, children, 11 grandchildren and 9 great-grandchildren.

Career statistics

Regular season and playoffs

External links
 

1907 births
1996 deaths
Canadian ice hockey defencemen
Detroit Falcons players
Detroit Olympics (IHL) players
Detroit Red Wings players
Ice hockey people from Ottawa
Montreal Canadiens players
Montreal Maroons players
Stanley Cup champions